Chand Sa Roshan Chehra is a 2005 Indian Hindi language romance film directed by Shabah Shamsi and produced by Salim. It stars Samir Aftab and Tamannaah in pivotal roles. It is the acting and Bollywood debut movie for Tamannaah.

Plot 
It's a teenage love story full of romance, emotions, and values. This is the story of Raj and Jiya, who loved each other from childhood. But circumstances take them apart a distance of seven seas, by Jiya's opportunist father Oberoi, who did not approve the alliance of his daughter Jiya with his friend Kapur's son Raj. Raj could not forget Jiya for even a day in his life. It was the last wish of Raj's mother that only Jiya should become her daughter-in-law. Kapur takes a promise from Raj that he will one day bring back Jiya as his daughter-in-law. One day, fate gives Raj a chance to go abroad to the same place where Jiya lives. Raj meets Jiya but both become enemies of each other without knowing that they have longed for each other, all their lives. Raj meets a beautiful girl Firdaus in the distant land and a friendship develops, which is not liked by Firdaus's fiancé Raj lands in trouble to be bailed out by Firdaus herself. During a youth festival, Raj wins the competition that infuriates Jiya, and she gets Raj beaten up by a local boy! Raj wants revenge and in the process, both of them come to know that they are each other's lost love.

But misunderstanding crops in and Jiya agrees to marry another boy. During Jiya's engagement ceremony, Raj reaches and tries to convey his love to Jiya. Jiya is heartbroken and wants to break her engagement. Fate once again plays its own game and the lovers are separated once again, because Oberoi learns that Raj is the same boy from whom he had taken Jiya away. How Jiya and Raj fight fate and destiny, and how both of them come together becomes the pivotal part of the story.

Cast 
 Samir Aftab as Raj Kapur
 Tamannaah as Jiya Oberoi
 Himani Shivpuri
 Talat Aziz as Kapur, Raj's father
 Kiran Kumar as Oberoi, Jiya's father
 Vijayendra Ghatge
 Kishori Shahane
 Apoorva Davda
 Firoz Khan
 Nirmal Soni
 Kurush Deboo as College Principal (guest appearance)
 Rajni Chandra (guest appearance)
 Master Sonu

Soundtrack 
"Doli Leke Aye Hai" and "Age Age Chahat Chali" were the most popular songs from this film. The soundtrack was a hit.

References

External links 
 

2000s Hindi-language films
2005 films
Films scored by Jatin–Lalit
2000s romance films